Kroměříž District is a district (okres) within the Zlín Region of the Czech Republic. Its capital is the town of Kroměříž.

List of municipalities
Bařice-Velké Těšany -
Bezměrov -
Blazice -
Bořenovice -
Brusné -
Břest -
Bystřice pod Hostýnem -
Cetechovice -
Chomýž -
Chropyně -
Chvalčov -
Chvalnov-Lísky -
Dřínov -
Holešov -
Honětice -
Horní Lapač -
Hoštice -
Hulín -
Jankovice -
Jarohněvice -
Karolín -
Komárno -
Koryčany -
Kostelany -
Kostelec u Holešova -
Kroměříž -
Kunkovice -
Kurovice -
Kvasice -
Kyselovice -
Lechotice -
Litenčice -
Loukov -
Lubná -
Ludslavice -
Lutopecny -
Martinice -
Míškovice -
Morkovice-Slížany -
Mrlínek -
Němčice -
Nítkovice -
Nová Dědina -
Osíčko -
Pacetluky -
Pačlavice -
Počenice-Tetětice -
Podhradní Lhota -
Prasklice -
Pravčice -
Prusinovice -
Přílepy -
Rajnochovice -
Rataje -
Roštění -
Roštín -
Rusava -
Rymice -
Šelešovice -
Skaštice -
Slavkov pod Hostýnem -
Soběsuky -
Střílky -
Střížovice -
Sulimov -
Troubky-Zdislavice -
Třebětice -
Uhřice -
Věžky -
Vítonice -
Vrbka -
Zahnašovice -
Žalkovice -
Záříčí -
Zástřizly -
Zborovice -
Zdounky -
Žeranovice -
Zlobice

References

 
Districts of the Czech Republic